Martina Hingis defeated Jana Novotná in the final, 2–6, 6–3, 6–3 to win the ladies' singles tennis title at the 1997 Wimbledon Championships. At 16 years and 278 days old, Hingis became the youngest person to win a Wimbledon singles title since Lottie Dod in 1887.

Steffi Graf was the two-time reigning champion, but did not compete due to injury. This was also the first Wimbledon for future five-time champion Venus Williams.

Seeds

  Martina Hingis (champion)
  Monica Seles (third round)
  Jana Novotná (final)
  Iva Majoli (quarterfinals)
  Lindsay Davenport (second round)
  Amanda Coetzer (second round)
  Anke Huber (third round)
  Arantxa Sánchez Vicario (semifinals)
  Mary Pierce (fourth round)
  Conchita Martínez (third round)
  Mary Joe Fernández (fourth round)
  Irina Spîrlea (fourth round)
  Kimberly Po (first round)
  Brenda Schultz-McCarthy (third round)
  Ruxandra Dragomir (first round)
  Barbara Paulus (second round)

Qualifying

Draw

Finals

Top half

Section 1

Section 2

Section 3

Section 4

Bottom half

Section 5

Section 6

Section 7

Section 8

References

External links

1997 Wimbledon Championships on WTAtennis.com
1997 Wimbledon Championships – Women's draws and results at the International Tennis Federation

Women's Singles
Wimbledon Championship by year – Women's singles
Wimbledon Championships
Wimbledon Championships